Carlos Vidal Sanabria Acuña (born 11 April 1967 in San Lorenzo, Paraguay) is a former football midfielder from Paraguay.

Club
Sanabria started his football career in the youth divisions of Club 13 Tuyutí of Capiatá and then moved to Guaraní before making his debut for Olimpia Asunción in 1987. His career in Olimpia would last until 1995, winning several national and international championships with the club. Afterwards, Sanabria had brief stints in several clubs such as River Plate (Asuncion), Deportivo Pereira, Libertad, Resistencia, Sportivo Luqueño and Sol de América before retiring.

International 
Sanabria made his international debut for the Paraguay national football team on 1 July 1989 in a 1989 Copa América match against Peru (5-2 win), substituting Alfredo Mendoza in the 86th minute. He obtained a total number of 21 international caps, scoring one goal for the national side. Sanabria played in the Copa America 1989, Copa America 1991 and Copa America 1993.

Honours

Club
 Olimpia
 Paraguayan Primera División: 1988, 1989, 1993, 1995
 Copa Libertadores: 1990
 Supercopa Sudamericana: 1990
 Recopa Sudamericana: 1990
 Torneo República: 1992

References

1966 births
Living people
Paraguayan footballers
Club Olimpia footballers
Sportivo Luqueño players
Club Sol de América footballers
Copa Libertadores-winning players
Paraguayan Primera División players
Paraguay international footballers
Paraguayan expatriate footballers
1989 Copa América players
1991 Copa América players
1993 Copa América players
Deportivo Pereira footballers
People from San Lorenzo, Paraguay
Association football midfielders